Löwenstein, Lowenstein or Loewenstein is a German- and Yiddish-language surname meaning "lion stone".  A dialect form of the name is Lewenstein, which is also the original Yiddish form. Other variants are Levenstein and Levenshtein.

Notable people with the name include:

Lowenstein

 Allard K. Lowenstein, former U.S. Representative and civil rights leader
Daniel H. Lowenstein (attorney) (born 1943), professor of law at UCLA Law School
Daniel H. Lowenstein (physician), professor in the Department of Neurology at the University of California, San Francisco
 Doug Lowenstein, founder and former President of the Entertainment Software Association
 Evan and Jaron Lowenstein, Jewish American brothers who perform as Evan and Jaron
 John Lowenstein, Major league baseball player
 Leah Lowenstein, American nephrologist
 Richard Lowenstein, Australian film director
 Roger Lowenstein, American financial journalist

Löwenstein

 Hubertus Prinz zu Löwenstein-Wertheim-Freudenberg (1906–1984), German politician and journalist
 Rudolf Löwenstein (1819–1891), German author
 Hans Louis Ferdinand von Löwenstein zu Löwenstein (1874–1959), German politician
 Jakob Löwenstein (1799–1869), German rabbi and writer
 László Löwenstein, real name of Hungarian-born actor Peter Lorre (1904-1964)
 Lippmann Hirsch Löwenstein (1809–1848), Hebrew scholar

Loewenstein

 Alfred Loewenstein, Belgian soldier, aviator, sportsman, and businessman
 Antony Loewenstein, Jewish-Australian political activist and journalist
 George Loewenstein, Professor of Economics and Psychology
 Jason Loewenstein, American rock musician and a member of the indie-rock band Sebadoh
 Jennifer Loewenstein, American professor and political activist
 Karl Loewenstein, German-American professor of government and law
 Rudolph Loewenstein (psychoanalyst), disciple of Sigmund Freud
 Rupert Loewenstein, German-Bavarian aristocrat and the longtime financial manager of the rock band The Rolling Stones.

Fictional characters
 Susan Lowenstein, a fictional character in the novel and film, The Prince of Tides
 Margravine di Chiave Lowenstein, a fictional character in Thomas Pynchon's novel V.

See also
Lewenstein
Levenstein

Jewish surnames
Yiddish-language surnames